Sean Bernard Long (born 24 September 1976), also known by the nickname of "Longy", is an English former professional rugby league footballer, who is the current head coach of Featherstone Rovers in the Championship. He has played in the 1990s and 2000s. An England and Great Britain international , Long is regarded by many as one of the finest British players of his generation. He began his career with the Wigan Warriors, and also played for the Widnes Vikings and Hull FC, but is best known for his time playing for St Helens in the Super League with whom he won a total of four Super League championships and five Challenge Cups, as well as numerous individual accolades including the Man of Steel award, and three Lance Todd Trophies.
He is the current head-coach of Featherstone Rovers.

Early life
Between the ages of eleven and thirteen Long attended St Joseph's Catholic Comprehensive School in Horwich but moved to the Deanery High School on Frog Lane in Wigan because the former only played football, not rugby.

Playing career - rugby league

Domestic

Wigan
After signing from local amateur side, Wigan St Judes, Long started his career at Wigan.

Widnes
After Wigan released him from his contract, Long moved to Widnes, where he attracted the attention of several of the European Super League's top clubs.

St Helens
He was signed by St Helens in 1997.

Long played for St Helens from the interchange bench, kicking two goals in their 1999 Super League Grand Final victory over Bradford Bulls.

Long twice set the St Helens record for the number of points scored in a Super League season, gaining 284 points in 1999 and 352 points in 2000. 

Having won the 1999 Championship, St Helens contested in the 2000 World Club Challenge against National Rugby League Premiers the Melbourne Storm, with Long playing at scrum half back and kicking a goal in the loss. Long played for St Helens at scrum half and kicked four goals in their 2000 Super League Grand Final victory over Wigan Warriors and was named as Man of Steel in 2000. 

As Super League V champions, St Helens played against 2000 NRL Premiers Brisbane Broncos in the 2001 World Club Challenge. Long played at scrum half, scoring a try, three goals and a field goal in Saints' victory.

Long played for St Helens at scrum half, scoring a try, a goal and the match-winning drop goal in their 2002 Super League Grand Final victory against the Bradford Bulls. 

Having won Super League VI, St Helens contested the 2003 World Club Challenge against 2002 NRL Premiers Sydney Roosters. Long played at stand-off in Saints' 38–0 loss. 

By 2005, Long had scored 2,000 points for St Helens. During the 2005's Super League X, he sustained a broken cheek bone in a challenge by Wigan Warrior' Terry Newton in an incident that saw Newton receive a 12-match ban, the heaviest for an on-field action in Super League history at the time.

Long played for St Helens at scrum half and scored a try in their 2006 Challenge Cup Final victory over Huddersfield Giants and won the Lance Todd Trophy as man-of-the-match in a Challenge Cup final for a record third time. St Helens reached the 2006 Super League Grand final to be contested against Hull FC and Long played at scrum half in Saints' 26–4 victory. 

As 2006 Super League champions, St Helens faced 2006 NRL Premiers Brisbane Broncos in the 2007 World Club Challenge. Long captained Saints from scrum half in their 18–14 victory. St Helens in 2007 took all honours apart from the Super League title when they were beaten by Leeds at Old Trafford in the Grand Final. In 2007 Long received a testimonial match for St Helens against Leigh. Former St Helens players returned for the game, including Chris Joynt, Tommy Martyn and Paul Newlove. St Helens won the game 40–10.
 

He played in 2008's Super League XIII Grand Final defeat by Leeds.

He played in the 2009 Super League Grand Final defeat by the Leeds Rhinos at Old Trafford.

Hull FC
On 1 June 2009 it was announced that Sean had signed a two-year contract with Hull F.C. for the 2010 and 2011 seasons, leaving St Helens after 12 seasons. Also in 2009 an Autobiography, Longy: Booze, Brawls, Sex and Scandal was published. Long kicked his 1,000th goal for St. Helens on 22 February 2009 in a game against Huddersfield.

Long announced his retirement from playing rugby league on the morning of 10 August 2011.

International
In the 1997 post season, Long was selected to play for Great Britain from the interchange bench in two matches of the Super League Test series against Australia.

In 2004, Long served a three-month ban for his part in the 2004 rugby league betting scandal. Despite this, Long was selected in the Great Britain team to compete in the end of season 2004 Rugby League Tri-Nations tournament. In the final against Australia he played at scrum half in the Lions' 44–4 loss. 

Following the 2006 season, Long was selected for Great Britain in the Tri nations. Long played in the first game between Great Britain and Australia, which resulted in Great Britain's first victory in Sydney in 18 years, with a score of 23–12. However, on 13 November 2006, Long returned home from the Tri-Nations tour, with 'personal reasons' cited as the reason by Great Britain coach Brian Noble.

Long officially retired from international football on 16 April 2007, wishing to concentrate on his club career.

Playing career - rugby union
On 1 November 2011 it was announced he had signed a playing contract with Rugby Union side Preston Grasshoppers in SSE National League 2 North.

In 2017, he joined rugby union side Orrell RUFC.

Coaching career

Salford
Following his retirement as a player, Long began a coaching career, and began an assistant coaching job with Salford.

Samoa
In 2013, Sean Long was appointed assistant coach of Samoa's 2013 Rugby League World Cup campaign. In 2014 Long reprised his role as Samoa played in the Four Nations. Sean Long was appointed assistant coach for Samoa for the 2017 Rugby League World Cup.

St Helens
In November 2014, Long left Salford and took up the assistant coach role at St. Helens following former teammate Keiron Cunningham's appointment as head coach from 2015 onwards.

Harlequin FC (RU)
He was assistant coach of Harlequin FC after leaving St Helens.

Leeds Rhinos
On 26 October 2020 Long was confirmed as the Assistant Coach at Leeds Rhinos marking his return to rugby league.

France
On 29 Mar 2021 Long was named as assistant coach for France as they prepare for the forthcoming 2021 Rugby League World Cup, alongside his responsibilities at Leeds Rhinos.

References

External links
Sean Long St Helens Career Page on the Saints Heritage Society Website''.
Sean Long Statistics at wigan.rlfans.com
(archived by web.archive.org) Long makes début for Saints
France profile

1976 births
Living people
England national rugby league team players
English rugby league coaches
English rugby league players
English rugby union players
Featherstone Rovers coaches
Great Britain national rugby league team players
Hull F.C. players
Lance Todd Trophy winners
Orrell R.U.F.C. players
Preston Grasshoppers R.F.C. players
Rugby league five-eighths
Rugby league halfbacks
Rugby league players from Wigan
Rugby union players from Wigan
St Helens R.F.C. captains
St Helens R.F.C. players
Widnes Vikings players
Wigan Warriors players